The Honda CBR1100XX Super Blackbird is a Honda motorcycle, part of the CBR series made from 1996 to 2007. Two years later the title passed to the Suzuki Hayabusa, which reached . The Blackbird is named after the Lockheed SR-71, also a speed record holder.

It has the largest-displacement engine in Honda's CBR range of motorcycles.

Development 
In the mid 1990s, Honda was determined to produce the world's fastest production motorcycle and to take over the associated bragging rights and marketing impact, at the time held by Kawasaki's Ninja ZX11. This led to the creation of the CBR1100XX Super Blackbird. The Blackbird name is a nod to the Lockheed SR-71 aircraft, the world's fastest production aircraft.

Its supremacy over the ZX-11 was confirmed in April 2007 by Motorcycle Consumer News, although the speeds achieved were slightly lower and the margin was narrower.

In 1999, the Suzuki Hayabusa overtook the CBR1100XX. It was listed in the 2000 Millennium Edition of Guinness World Records as the world's fastest production bike with a top speed of  Hayabusa is the Japanese term for the Peregrine Falcon, a species of raptor which preys on blackbirds.

References 

 

 
 

CBR1100XX
Sport bikes
Motorcycles introduced in 1996